Fibonacci's identity may refer either to:

 the Brahmagupta–Fibonacci identity in algebra, showing that the set of all sums of two squares is closed under multiplication
 the Cassini and Catalan identities on Fibonacci numbers